Sweden held a general election on the 16 September 1973. Results are published by the Statistical Central Bureau.

National results

Results by region

By percentage share

By votes

Results by constituency

Percentage share

By votes

1970–1973 bloc comparison

By votes

By votes

Municipal summary

Results by municipality

It is important to note that the listing of the results have been made with the 21st-century county mergers in mind to enable consistency. As a result, the Scanian and West Gothian constituencies that were in separate counties as of 1973 have been listed under their current counties, although the names of the original constituency from 1973 are included. "Share" denotes how large a share of the constituency each municipality had as well as the share of the national vote of 5,168,996 held by the overall constituency.

Counties not in accordance with provinces include the three Småland counties of Jönköping, Kalmar (including Öland) and Kronoberg. From an enlarged perspective, the three provinces of Västergötland, Bohuslän and Dalsland form Västra Götaland. In 1973 those consisted of three separate counties, namely, Bohuslän, Skaraborg and Älvsborg. Skåne County did not exist in 1973 either, with the province divided between Kristianstad County in the north and Malmöhus County in the south. Örebro County is divided between three separate provinces centered around Närke. As a result, Västmanland County is smaller than the province. Stockholm County is also consisting part of the provinces of Södermanland and Uppland, the latter of which forms Uppsala County in its north. Farther north, Gävleborg is a merger between Gästrikland and Hälsingland, Västernorrland consists of Medelpad and Ångermanland, whereas Lapland is divided between Västerbotten and Norrbotten counties. Härjedalen is a single municipality roughly corresponding with the provincial borders, merged into Jämtland County.

Blekinge

Dalarna

Dalarna County was known as Kopparberg County at the time, but shared the same borders as in the 21st century.

Kopparberg County

Gotland

Gävleborg

Halland

Jämtland

Jönköping

Kalmar

Kronoberg

Norrbotten

Skåne
The province of Skåne, later unified into one county, was divided into Malmöhus and Kristianstad counties at the time, also resulting in three separate constituencies, one for each county and a third for the metropolitan area of Öresund, that was part of Malmöhus.

Four-city constituency
()

Kristianstad

Malmöhus County

Stockholm
Stockholm County was divided into Stockholm Municipality and the surrounding county of suburbs or more rural areas.

Stockholm (city)

Stockholm County

Södermanland

Uppsala

Värmland

Västerbotten

Västernorrland

Västmanland

Västra Götaland
The later iteration of Västra Götaland County was divided into three separate counties and five constituencies in 1973. The three counties were Gothenburg and Bohuslän, Skaraborg and Älvsborg. Gothenburg/Bohus were divided into one constituency representing Gothenburg Municipality and one representing Bohuslän, whereas Älvsborg was divided into two constituencies, one in the north and one in the south. Skaraborg had one constituency for the whole county.

Bohuslän

Gothenburg

Skaraborg

Älvsborg N

Älvsborg S

Örebro

Östergötland

References

General elections in Sweden